Luxemburger Wochenblatt was a newspaper published in Luxembourg between 1821 and 1826. It was authored by Friedrich-Georg Weiß, formerly secretary to the Prussian police of the fortress.

Defunct newspapers published in Luxembourg
German-language newspapers published in Luxembourg
1821 in Luxembourg
1826 in Luxembourg